Old Mother Riley Joins Up is a 1940 British comedy film directed by Maclean Rogers and starring Arthur Lucan, Kitty McShane, Martita Hunt, Bruce Seton and Garry Marsh. It was part of the long-running Old Mother Riley series.

Plot summary
Old Mother Riley works as a nurse before volunteering for the Auxiliary Territorial Service. With the help of her daughter Kitty and Kitty's boyfriend Lieutenant Travers, she thwarts a plan by enemy agents to steal important secret documents.

Cast
 Arthur Lucan ...  Mrs. Riley
 Kitty McShane ...  Kitty Riley
 Glen Alyn ...  Pauline
 Dorothy Dewhurst ...  Mrs. Rayful
 Martita Hunt ...  Commandant
 H. F. Maltby ...  Gen. Hogsley
 Garry Marsh ...  Dr. Leach
 Bryan Powley ...  Mr. Rayful
 Bruce Seton ...  Lt. Travers
 Jeanne Stuart ...  Nurse Wilson

Critical reception
TV Guide called the film, "a tolerable romp that kept patriotic English fires burning during the early part of WW II."

References

External links

1940 films
1940 comedy films
Films directed by Maclean Rogers
British comedy films
British black-and-white films
Films shot at Station Road Studios, Elstree
1940s English-language films
1940s British films